Kevin Jorge Amílcar Moscoso Mayén (born 13 June 1999) is a Guatemalan professional footballer who plays as a goalkeeper for Liga Nacional club Mixco, on loan from Comunicaciones, and the Guatemala national team.

He made his debut for the full Guatemalan team against Nicaragua on 7 October 2020.

Honours
Comunicaciones 
CONCACAF League: 2021
Liga Nacional de Guatemala: Clausura 2022

Individual 
CONCACAF League Golden Glove: 2021

References

External links
 
 

1999 births
Living people
Guatemalan footballers
Guatemala international footballers
Association football goalkeepers
Comunicaciones F.C. players
Cobán Imperial players
Liga Nacional de Fútbol de Guatemala players